Cassandra Laity is an author and researcher in the field of modernism.  In 2015 she is a visiting scholar at the University of Tennessee-Knoxville.

Early life and education
Laity completed her PhD at the University of Michigan.

Career
In 1985 Laity was  an Assistant Professor of English at Dickinson College in Carlisle, Pennsylvania. She was a professor at Drew University (1992–2013) and has held appointments at the University of Montreal, Vanderbilt University, University of Oregon-Eugene.

Laity helped found the Modernist Studies Association and served as an editor of its journal Modernism/modernity for ten years (2000–2010).

Laity writes, lectures and leads discussions on the themes of feminism and decadence in modernist literature and poetry.

Laity has written many articles, which have been published in the journals Modern Drama, Modernism/Modernity, ELH, Victorian Poetry and Feminist Studies. She is author or editor of the books H.D.'s Paint it Today (NYU 1992), H.D. and the Victorian Fin-de-Siecle: Gender, Modernism, Decadence (CUP 1996; pbk 2009), and  Gender, Desire and Sexuality in T.S. Eliot, with Nancy Gish (CUP 2004; pbk 2007).

In 2015 Laity's research centers around the impact of Darwin's early writings as the Beagle's resident geologist and global explorer on the work of the poets A.C. Swinburne, Walter Pater, H.D. and Elizabeth Bishop.  She is in the process of writing a book on this topic.

She has been awarded fellowships by the Mellon Foundation, NEH, and Beinecke Rare Book and Manuscript Library.

References

External links
Google Scholar citations

Year of birth missing (living people)
Living people
University of Michigan alumni
University of Tennessee faculty
Dickinson College faculty
Academic staff of the Université de Montréal
Vanderbilt University faculty
University of Oregon faculty